Depend on Me is the first Japanese studio album by South Korean boy band VIXX. It was released on January 27, 2016, under the labels of Jellyfish Entertainment and CJ Victor Entertainment. It features the single "Depend on Me" and previously released Japanese singles "Error" and "Can't Say".

On the same day of the release Depend on Me ranked at number 4 on the Oricon daily album chart. Since then, Depend on Me has risen up the charts and topping at number 1 for January 30. The album charted at number 4 on the weekly album chart for two weeks.

Background and promotion
On November 30, Jellyfish Entertainment and CJ Victor Entertainment revealed that VIXX will be releasing their first original full-length Japanese studio album, Depend on Me, on  January 27, 2016. It was revealed that upon release of the album that there would be three versions, a regular edition and two limited editions titled A and B with each having bonus tracks and trading cards featuring a random VIXX member and along with limited edition A there would be a DVD containing the music video and making movie for "Depend on Me" and limited edition B would contain a booklet.

On January 7, 2016 Jellyfish Entertainment and CJ Victor Entertainment revealed the jacket photographs which will be used for all three editions of Depend on Me, and released a teaser to the music video.

On January 23, 2016, a highlight medley for the album was released on CJ Victor Entertainment's official YouTube Channel.

To promote the album VIXX held holding Mini Live & High Touch events in Sapporo, Kobe, Tokyo, Osaka and Fukuoka from January 13, 2016, to January 31, 2016.

Singles

"Error"
The single peaked at number 6 on the Oricon charts and sold over 19,381 CD copies.

"Can't Say"
On September 9, 2015, VIXX made their second Japanese comeback with their second Japanese language single "Can't Say". "Can't Say" was the first official song recorded in Japanese by VIXX with original lyrics by SHOW for Digz. Inc Group.  The single peaked at number 4 on the Oricon charts and sold over 31,289 CD copies. The single also included the song .  The music video was also released September 9, 2015. A Korean language version was later recorded and released with VIXX's second studio album Chained Up on November 10, 2015.

"Depend on Me"
"Depend on Me" is the album's lead single. On January 18, 2016, the short version of the music video for "Depend on Me" was released in Japan. The song's lyrics was written by SHOW for Digz, Inc. Group whilst the composition was by Erik Lidbom for Hitfire Production.

Track listing

Chart performance

Release history

References

External links
 
 
 

2016 albums
VIXX albums
Jellyfish Entertainment albums
Victor Entertainment albums
Japanese-language albums